In relativistic physics, Supplee's paradox (also called the submarine paradox) is a physical paradox that arises when considering the buoyant force exerted on a relativistic bullet (or in a submarine) immersed in a fluid subject to an ambient gravitational field. If a bullet has neutral buoyancy when it is at rest in a perfect fluid and then it is launched with a relativistic speed, observers at rest within the fluid would conclude that the bullet should sink, since its density will increase due to the length contraction effect. On the other hand, in the bullet's proper frame it is the moving fluid that becomes denser and hence the bullet would float. But the bullet cannot sink in one frame and float in another, so there is a paradox situation.

The paradox was first formulated by James M. Supplee (1989), where a non-rigorous explanation was presented. George Matsas has analysed this paradox in the scope of general relativity and also pointed out that these relativistic buoyancy effects could be important in some questions regarding the  thermodynamics of black holes. A comprehensive explanation of Supplee's paradox through both the special and the general theory of relativity was presented by Vieira.
Hrvoje Nikolic noticed that rigidity of the submarine is not essential and presented a general relativistic analysis revealing that paradox resolves by the fact that the relevant velocity of the submarine is relative to Earth (which is the source of the gravitational field), not relative to the observer.

Buoyancy
To simplify the analysis, it is customary to neglect drag and viscosity, and even to assume that the fluid has constant density.

A small object immersed in a container of fluid subjected to a uniform gravitational field will be subject to a net downward gravitational force, compared with the net downward gravitational force on an equal volume of the fluid.  If the object is less dense than the fluid, the difference between these two vectors is an upward pointing vector, the buoyant force, and the object will rise.  If things are the other way around, it will sink.  If the object and the fluid have equal density, the object is said to have neutral buoyancy and it will neither rise nor sink.

Resolution
The resolution comes down to observing that the usual Archimedes principle cannot be applied in the relativistic case. If the theory of relativity is correctly employed to analyse the forces involved, there will be no true paradox.

Supplee himself concluded that the paradox can be resolved with a more careful analysis of the gravitational buoyancy forces acting on the bullet. In the proper reference frame of the bullet, the same result is obtained by noting that this frame is not inertial, which implies that the shape of the container will no more be flat, on the contrary, the sea floor becomes curved upwards, which results in the bullet getting far away from the sea surface, i.e., in the bullet relatively sinking.

The non-justified assumption considered by Supplee that the gravitational force on the bullet should depend on its energy content was eliminated by George Matsas, who used the full mathematical methods of general relativity in order to explain the Supplee paradox and agreed with Supplee's results. In particular, he modelled the situation using a Rindler chart, where a submarine is accelerated from the rest to a given velocity v. Matsas concluded that the paradox can be resolved by noting that in the frame of the fluid, the shape of the bullet is altered, and derived the same result which had been obtained by Supplee.  Matsas has applied a similar analysis to shed light on certain questions involving the thermodynamics of black holes.

Finally, Vieira has recently analysed the submarine paradox through the special and general relativity. In the first case, he showed that gravitomagnetic effects should be taken into account in order to describe the forces acting in a moving submarine underwater. When these effects are considered, a relativistic Archimedes principle can be formulated, from which he showed that the submarine must sink in both frames. Vieira also considered the case of a curved space-time in the proximity of the Earth. In this case he assumed that the space-time can be approximately regarded as consisting of a flat space but a curved time. He showed that in this case the gravitational force between the Earth at rest and a moving body increases with the speed of the body in the same way as considered by Supplee, providing in this way a justification for his assumption. Analysing the paradox again with this speed-dependent gravitational force, the Supplee paradox is explained and the results agree with those obtained by Supplee and Matsas.

See also
 Bell's spaceship paradox
 Ehrenfest paradox
 Ladder paradox
 Twin paradox

References

External links
 Light Speed Submarine - article about the paradox in Physical Review Focus

Physical paradoxes
Theory of relativity
Relativistic paradoxes